Leon J. Kamin (December 29, 1927 – December 22, 2017) was an American psychologist known for his contributions to learning theory and his critique of estimates of the heritability of IQ. He studied under Richard Solomon at Harvard and contributed several important ideas about conditioning, including the "blocking effect".

Early life and education
Leon Kamin was born into a Jewish family in Taunton, Massachusetts; his father was a rabbi.  Kamin studied psychology at Harvard. While a Harvard undergraduate, he joined the Communist Party, but dropped out of the party by 1950 and became a Harvard graduate student and teaching fellow. While a graduate student, Kamin was subpoenaed by the Jenner anti-Communist Senate committee, but he refused to name others who had been (or might have been) Communists and cited his Fifth Amendment rights. As a result, Harvard refused to renew his fellowship. Next, Joe McCarthy's anti-communist committee came to Boston, looking for Communists and ex-Communists.  Refusing to names, Kamin was convicted of contempt of the Senate.  This caused job offers in the U.S. to dry up and he had to find employment in Canada, where held positions, first at McGill University, then at Queen’s University and McMaster University (where he chaired the Psychology Department in 1957–58). In 1968 he returned to the U.S. and chaired Princeton University's Department of Psychology and later the Psychology Department at Northeastern University in Boston, Massachusetts.

Career
Kamin's most well-known contribution to learning theory was his discovery and analysis of the "blocking effect" (1969). He showed that conditioning an animal to associate a salient conditioned stimulus (CSb), such as a bright light, with a salient unconditioned stimulus (US), like a shock, is "blocked" when CSb is presented simultaneously with another conditioned stimulus (CSa) that was already conditioned to the US. (Kamin used rats in most of his research, but the effect has been found in many animals).  However, a 2016 article in the Journal of Experimental Psychology: General reported "15 failures to observe a blocking effect despite the use of procedures that are highly similar or identical to those used in published studies."

In March 1972 an invitation from the Princeton Psychology Department (which Kamin chaired at the time) to Richard Herrnstein (who had a few months earlier published a contentious article about race, gender, class, and intelligence) sparked a major controversy and threats of protest.  Herrnstein canceled his visit, saying that "It would be enough for me not to come if they had placards on the wall." Kamin defended the invitation to Herrnstein, opposed the protests, and organized a meeting to discuss the controversy.  The resulting debates spurred Kamin to start investigating the work on heritability of intelligence of Cyril Burt, work that Herrnstein was citing to support his views.  Kamin concluded that Burt had falsified his data.  He revealed his discovery, first, in an invited address to the 1973 meeting of the Eastern Psychological Association, where his audience of 1,000 gave him a standing ovation.  In 1974 he published his findings about Burt in the book The Science and Politics of IQ. In it, Kamin also reviewed the early history of intelligence testing and charged WWI era psychologists with bias against non-WASP immigrants, who were targeted by the Immigration Act of 1924    To Kamin and other  critics of Jensen and Herrnstein, psychology in the 1970s was again supporting anti-democratic social policies, attempting to reverse the gains of the Civil Rights and Women’s movements.

As department chair at Princeton and then Northeastern, Kamin’s achievements included the creation of programs to recruit and support graduate students of color. 

Kamin co-authored the controversial book Not in Our Genes (1984) with geneticist Richard Lewontin and neurobiologist Steven Rose. This book criticized sociobiology and evolutionary psychology. Kamin was known in some circles for his speculation that the heritability of IQ could be "zero". (Mackintosh, 1998) In 1983, he was named a Guggenheim Fellow in psychology.

He was honorary professor of psychology at the University of Cape Town in South Africa.

Bibliography 
 The Science and Politics of IQ (1974)

Notes

References
 Kamin, L. J. (1969). Predictability, surprise, attention, and conditioning. In B. A. Campbell & R. M . Church (Eds.), Punishment and aversive behavior (pp. 279–296). New York: Appleton-Century-Crofts.
 Kamin, L.J. (2005). Letter to the Editor, New York Review of Books, May 26.
 Mackintosh, N. (1998). IQ and Human Intelligence. Oxford: University Press. pp. 78–79.
 Loehlin, Lindzey & Spuhler (Freeman, 1975). Race Differences in Intelligence

External links
 Profile at Human Intelligence
 

1927 births
2017 deaths
20th-century American psychologists
Jewish American social scientists
Harvard University alumni
Intelligence researchers
Northeastern University faculty
People from Taunton, Massachusetts
Race and intelligence controversy
Academic staff of the University of Cape Town
Princeton University faculty
21st-century American Jews